Pastry Panic is a platform video game and the second release from American independent game developer Underground Pixel. The game was released in May 2012 for iOS. Since its release, the game has been generally well received by critics. The gameplay revolves around the player character eating as many sweets as possible to score points.

Gameplay

In Pastry Panic, the core gameplay revolves around a dinosaur-lizard hybrid named Dino eating as many sweets as possible to score points, while also consuming all of the bolts that appear on-screen. When the bolt counter hits zero, too many pieces of metal have escaped, clogging the gears and ending the game.

The player has a choice between two different modes, Mad Dash and Tongue Tied. The former offers the player the opportunity to walk along conveyor belts eating different treats. In the latter, the player remains static in the center and grabs snacks using his long tongue.

The game offers the player power-ups to boost their scores, such as slowing down the conveyor belts. Other power-ups can have negative consequences and make the game more difficult, such as taking an extra bolt away from the counter or reversing the belt direction.

Reception

Pastry Panic was favorably received by critics and holds a score of 70/100 on Metacritic review score aggregator. Harry Slater of PocketGamer gave the game 7/10 calling it simple and addictive, but lacking greater features. Rob Rich of 148Apps rated Pastry Panic 4/5 stars, calling it "another pick-up-and-play iOS game destined for classic status." Dant Rambo of Gamezebo shared similar sentiments, giving it the same rating and noting its simplicity and addictiveness, as well praising its retro graphics.

References

2012 video games
Dinosaurs in video games
IOS games
IOS-only games
Platform games
Single-player video games
Video games developed in the United States